Henco Beukes (born 30 June 2000) is a South African rugby union player for the  in the Currie Cup and . His regular position is flanker.

Beukes was named in the  squad for the 2021 Currie Cup Premier Division.

References

South African rugby union players
2000 births
Living people
Rugby union flankers
Blue Bulls players
Bulls (rugby union) players
Griquas (rugby union) players
Rugby union players from Worcester, South Africa